Ted or Teddy Daniels may refer to:

Ted Daniels, character in Adventures of Gallant Bess
Ted Daniels, CEO of ECLIPSE (reservoir simulator)
Ted Daniels, musician in Defunkt
Teddy Daniels, main character in Shutter Island
Theodore A. Daniels, American bishop

See also
Edward Daniels (disambiguation)